Carlos Alberto Torres is the name of:

 Carlos Alberto Torres (1944–2016), former Brazilian football player
 Carlos Torres (astronomer) (1929–2011), Chilean astronomer
 Carlos Alberto Torres (Puerto Rican nationalist) (born 1952), Puerto Rican nationalist
 Carlos Alberto Torres (sociologist) (born 1950), professor of social science at UCLA

See also
 Carlos Torres (disambiguation)